Gora is a rural locality (a village) in Krasnopolyanskoye Rural Settlement, Nikolsky District, Vologda Oblast, Russia. The population was 13 as of 2002.

Geography 
The distance to Nikolsk is 13 km. Selivanovo is the nearest rural locality.

References 

Rural localities in Nikolsky District, Vologda Oblast